The Olaʻa banana hedyleptan moth (Omiodes euryprora) is a species of moth in the family Crambidae. It is endemic to the Hawaiian Islands.

This species was previously listed as Hedylepta euryprora and assessed as extinct. Information since the last assessment in 1996 suggests that this species is still extant in the Hawaiian Islands. 

The larvae feed on banana.

References

Sources

Omiodes
Endemic moths of Hawaii
Taxonomy articles created by Polbot